Chiba 4th district is a constituency of the House of Representatives in the Diet of Japan. It is located in the city of Funabashi in Western Chiba. As of 2016, 459,431 eligible voters were registered in the district. In the 2009 and 2012 general elections, the district had the lowest electoral weight throughout Japan at more than two times as many voters as the district with the highest electoral weight, Kōchi-3rd.

Before the electoral reform of 1994, Funabashi was part of Chiba 1st district where four Representatives had been elected by single non-transferable vote.

Former Prime Minister Yoshihiko Noda has represented Chiba 4th district since 2000 after initially losing it as a candidate for the New Frontier Party by 105 votes to Liberal Democrat Shōichi Tanaka in 1996. Amid the LDP landslide in 2012 that returned them into power, then-PM Noda became a rare DPJ politician who actually increased his share of vote in his constituency.

List of representatives

Election results 

 
  
 
 	
 
 	

  
  
 
 
 
 	
 	
 
  

  
  
 
 
 	
 	
 
  

 
 
 
 
  
  
 
  

In 2009, Yoshihiko Noda's candidacy was formally supported by the People's New Party, Mikio Fujita by New Komeito.

References 

Districts of the House of Representatives (Japan)